Vittorio Adorni (14 November 1937 – 24 December 2022) was an Italian professional road racing cyclist.

Early life and amateur career
Adorni was born in San Lazzaro di Parma on 14 November 1937. He was a talented amateur and showed early talent at riding alone. He began racing in 1955 and won the national amateur pursuit championship in 1959. Skill at riding fast alone won him the world professional road championship nine years later.

Adorni won the Trofeo de Gasperiin 1960 and turned professional during 1961 after winning the Coppa San Geo.

Professional career

Adorni won two races in his first full year as a professional in 1961, riding for Philco and winning stages of the Giro d'Italia and the Tour of Sardinia. Adorni was more a domestique than a leader but he nevertheless won the 1965 Giro and the 1968 world road race championship.  The championship was on the car race circuit at Imola, Italy. He broke clear with 93 km still to ride. He finished 10 minutes ahead of the field, helped in the peloton by his Italian teammates and also by Eddy Merckx, his normal teammate, who did not take up the chase.

The Cycling Hall of Fame, an American organisation, said:
"In 1968, Adorni taught Eddy Merckx of Belgium how to properly eat and rest during a Grand Tour. Merckx used this knowledge to not only win his first grand tour, the Giro d'Italia, but also the mountains and points jerseys as well, the first time ever this was done in a grand tour. Adorni finished second to Merckx in that race."

Retirement
Adorni rode as a professional from 1961 to 1970. He retired to work in insurance and then became directeur sportif of the Salvarani team until 1973. He became president of the Italian riders' association and a commentator for the television company, RAI. In 2001 he joined the management committee of the governing body, the Union Cycliste Internationale. The French magazine Vélo said: When he was nominated, no small number of observers asked 'Why him? Isn't he just Hein Verbruggen's puppet?'

The former Italian champion was chosen for his personality [était simplement victime de sa personnalité]. As a rider, he was respected by everyone. He was a gentleman. When Hein Verbruggen dug in, Adorni was a patient mediator, a natural negotiator. Thanks to him, the crisis with the organisers of the three grands tours didn't turn into a huge fiasco and he was able to maintain contacts. The world body was responsible for the Pro Tour; Adorni became its conscience.

Adorni worked in skiing, in public relations for the Winter Olympics at Innsbruck in 1976. He also worked in public relations at the summer Games in Montréal in 1976. From 1996 until 2004 he was President of Panathlon International. In 2000, he was a recipient of the Silver Olympic Order.

Adorni died in Parma on 24 December 2022, at the age of 85.

Major results
Sources:

Track
1958
 1st  National Track Championship, Individual Pursuit

Road

1960
 2nd Giornata della Bicicletta
1961
 1st Coppa San Geo
 3rd San Daniele Po
 10th Giro della Romagna
 10th Giro dell'Emilia
1962
 1st Stage 4 Giro di Sardegna
 2nd Milano–Torino
 4th Giro dell'Emilia
 5th Overall Giro d'Italia
1st Stage 15
 5th Trofeo Baracchi
 6th Grand Prix des Nations
 7th Trofeo Matteotti
1963
 1st Maggiora
 1st Tour des Quatre-Cantons
 2nd Overall Giro d'Italia
1st Stages 1 & 16
Held  after Stage 18
 3rd Liège–Bastogne–Liège
 4th Coppa Agostoni
 5th Milan–San Remo
 7th Trofeo Baracchi
 8th Overall Giro di Sardegna
1st Stages 5 & 6 
 10th Tre Valli Varesine
1964
 1st  Overall Giro di Sardegna
 2nd  Road race, UCI Road World Championships
 2nd Trofeo Baracchi
 2nd Antwerpen - Ougrée
 3rd Liège–Bastogne–Liège
 3rd Corsa Coppi
 4th Overall Giro d'Italia
1st Stages 1 & 14
 7th Trofeo Laigueglia
 7th Coppa Placci
 10th Overall Tour de France
1965
 1st  Overall Giro d'Italia
1st Stages 6, 13 & 19
 1st  Overall Tour de Romandie
1st Stages 1b & 3b
 1st Trofeo Città di Borgomanero
 1st GP Lugano
 2nd Milan–San Remo
 2nd Liège–Bastogne–Liège
 5th Milano–Torino
 6th Giro di Lombardia
 7th Paris–Roubaix
 8th Trofeo Laigueglia
 8th Corsa Coppi
1966
 1st  Overall Tour of Belgium
1st Stage 4
 1st Stage 1 Giro di Sardegna
 3rd Overall Paris–Nice
 6th Giro di Toscana
 6th Giro dell'Emilia
 7th Overall Giro d'Italia
1st Stage 13
Held  after Stages 13 & 14
 9th Tour of Flanders
1967
 1st  Overall Tour de Romandie
 1st Coppa Bernocchi
 2nd Giro della Provincia di Reggio Calabria
 2nd Giro di Campania
 2nd GP Forli
 3rd Milano–Torino
 4th Overall Giro d'Italia
1st Stage 20
 5th Overall Giro di Sardegna
 5th Liège–Bastogne–Liège
 8th Overall Tirreno–Adriatico
 10th Milano–Vignola
1968
 1st  Road race UCI Road World Championships
 1st Stage 1 Tirreno–Adriatico
 2nd Overall Giro d'Italia
 3rd GP Forli
 5th Overall Vuelta a España
 5th Trofeo Laigueglia
 8th Overall À travers Lausanne
1969
 1st  National Road Race Championship
 1st  Overall Tour de Suisse
1st Stages 5 & 9
 1st Stage 22 Giro d'Italia
 1st Giro della Provincia di Reggio Calabria
 1st GP Alghero
 1st Stage 5b Tirreno–Adriatico
 2nd Overall Tour de Romandie
1st Stages 2 & 3b
1970
 1st Stage 3 Tour de Romandie
 4th Overall Tirreno–Adriatico
 10th Overall Giro d'Italia

Grand Tour general classification results timeline

Honour 
 : Knight Grand Cross of the Order of Merit of the Italian Republic (27 December 2012)

References

External links
 

1937 births
2022 deaths
Sportspeople from Parma
Italian male cyclists
Giro d'Italia winners
Italian Giro d'Italia stage winners
UCI Road World Champions (elite men)
Tour de Suisse stage winners
Recipients of the Olympic Order
Cyclists from Emilia-Romagna
Knights Grand Cross of the Order of Merit of the Italian Republic
Commanders of the Order of Merit of the Italian Republic
Grand Officers of the Order of Merit of the Italian Republic